Madhuca malaccensis is a tree in the family Sapotaceae. It is named after Malacca in Peninsular Malaysia.

Description
The bark is greyish brown. Inflorescences bear up to eight flowers.

Distribution and habitat
Madhuca malaccensis is native to Thailand, Sumatra, Peninsular Malaysia, Singapore and Borneo. Its habitat is mixed dipterocarp forest to  altitude.

References

malaccensis
Trees of Thailand
Trees of Sumatra
Trees of Malaya
Trees of Borneo
Plants described in 1882